Erigeron multifolius is a Chinese species of flowering plants in the family Asteraceae. It grows on rocky slopes, and forest margins at high elevations in Tibet and Yunnan in southwestern China.

Erigeron multifolius is a perennial herb up to 25 cm (10 inches) tall, forming a thick underground rhizomes. Its flower heads have white, pale pink, or pale purple ray florets surrounding yellow disc florets.

References

multifolius
Flora of China
Plants described in 1937